Devil Doll is an American rockabilly band fronted by singer Colleen Duffy. Their song "Faith in Love", from the 2003 album Queen of Pain, was featured on Buffy the Vampire Slayer. Queen of Pain featured the recording talents of many top level studio musicians. The guitars on that album were played by well known studio guitarist Tim Pierce. 

Devil Doll has also featured many notable members in her live band including Mother Superior drummer Matt Tecu, and guitarist Ry Bradley. 

In January 2018, after 4 years of hiatus due to lead singer Colleen Duffy's illness, she announced a crowdfunding campaign to help finance a new album.

Discography

Queen of Pain (2002)

The Return of Eve (2007)

Lover & a Fighter (2020)

References

External links
 
 

Rockabilly music groups
American rock music groups
Musical groups with year of establishment missing